The GWR 2201 Class was a class of   steam locomotives built at Swindon Works under the aegis of William Dean for express passenger service on the Great Western Railway.  Built in 1881–82, they were numbered 2201 to 2220.

Design
They were, in essentials, a continuation of Joseph Armstrong's 806 Class of 1873. They differed from the originals in having a cab and a domeless boiler from the start.

Use
The 2201s were widely distributed over the GWR system. Members of the class were in use on the Didcot, Newbury and Southampton Railway around 1910. They were all withdrawn by the end of 1921.

References

Sources

2201
2-4-0 locomotives
Railway locomotives introduced in 1881
Standard gauge steam locomotives of Great Britain
Scrapped locomotives
Passenger locomotives